First Soviet-American Conference on Communication with Extraterrestrial Intelligence was a conference held on September 5–11, 1971, at the Byurakan Observatory, USSR. The conference was jointly organized by the U.S. National Academy of Sciences (with assistance from the U.S. National Science Foundation) and the U.S.S.R. Academy of Sciences.

Organizing committee: Carl Sagan, Frank Drake, Philip Morrison, Nikolai Kardashev, Victor Ambartsumian, Iosif Shklovsky, Vsevolod Troitsky.

Notable participants: Semion Braude, Francis Crick, Freeman Dyson, Marvin Minsky, Kent V. Flannery, Vitaly Ginzburg, Thomas Gold, Sebastian von Hoerner, David H. Hubel, Kenneth Kellermann, Richard Borshay Lee, György Marx, William H. McNeill, Bernard M. Oliver, Leslie Orgel, John R. Platt, Gunther Stent, Charles Hard Townes.

As a result of the conference, the following research directions were formulated:
 A search for signals and for evidence of astroengineering activities in the radiation of a few hundred chosen nearby stars and of a limited number of other selected objects, covering the wavelength range from visible to decimeter waves, using the largest existing astronomical instruments.
 A search for signals from powerful sources within galaxies of the local group, including searches for strong impulsive signals.
 Exploration of the region of minimum noise in the submillimeter band, in order to determine its suitability for observing extraterrestrial civilizations.
 The design, among others, of powerful new astronomical instruments with roughly the following parameters:
 A decimeter wave radiotelescope with an effective area >1 km2.
 A millimeter wave telescope with an effective area > 104 m2.
 A submillimeter wave telescope with an effective area > 103 m2.
 An infrared telescope with an effective area 102 m2.
 The definition of a system for keeping the entire sky under constant surveillance, which could lead to a search of wider scope than those listed under #1 and #2.

See also
Communication with extraterrestrial intelligence
Fermi paradox

References

Academic conferences
1971 conferences